XHJHS-FM is a radio station on 101.1 FM in Querétaro, Querétaro, known as Stereo Cristal.

History
XHJHS received its concession on January 14, 1988. The original concessionaire was José Horacio Septién under the name Radio XHJHS, S.A. de C.V. The station was operated by ACIR for most of its history and carried the Amor romantic format until 2017. In that year, Amor moved to another ACIR station (XHQTO-FM 97.9FM), and XHJHS was relaunched as Stereo Cristal under the control of Corporación Bajío Comunicaciones as its second Querétaro-market station after XHQRO-FM.

Horacio Septién had also obtained the concessions for XEFL-XHFL in Guanajuato and for a station in Ciudad del Carmen, Campeche, which was never built.

References

Radio stations in Querétaro